"A Duckling Swims in the Tisza" (Ukrainian: Пливе́ ка́ча по Тиси́ні, plyve kacha po Tysyni), also known as "Hey, a Duckling Swims in the Tisza" (Ukrainian: Гей, пливе кача по Тисині; hey, plyve kacha po Tysyni) is a Lemko folk song that became well known in the 21st century due to its frequent use as a requiem for protestors killed during the 2013-2014 Euromaidan, the 2014 Revolution of Dignity, and the ongoing Russo-Ukrainian War.

Origins 
According to the Ukrainian foklorist Ivan Khlanta, "A Duckling Swims in the Tiszla" was first recorded by Ukrainian conductor Dezső Zádor in the village of Volovets in Zakarpattia Oblast in the 1940s. The song was first published in the 1944 compilation album Narodni pisni pidkarpatskikh rusyniv (English: "folk songs of the Subcarpathian Ruthenians"). 

In traditional versions of the song, the lyrics follow the life and death of a young woman who refuses to marry a man she does not love, going against her mother's wishes. In the 1940s, the lyrics were substantially reworked by the Transcarpathian writer Vasyl Grendzha-Donsky, to tell the story of a soldier preparing to go to war. In most versions of the lyrics, the titular duckling crossing the river represents death and passage to the afterlife. 

During World War II, "A Duckling Swims in the Tisza" became part of the repertoire of the Ukrainian Insurgent Army.

History of recordings

1960s to 1980s 
The first known public performance of "A Duckling Swims in the Tisza" is believed to have occurred during the 1960s, by Transcarpathian folk singer Vira Baganych. In 1972, a recording of Baganych performing the song was included on the album Melodiya (English: "melody"). 

In 1986, "A Duckling Swims in the Tisza" re-emerged on the Ukrainian cultural scene when it was added to the repertoire of the Lviv-based musical ensemble Vatra. It was first performed by soloist Oksana Bilozir, and was subsequently performed as part of a duet between Bilozir and Victor Morozov. 

In 1988, the song was recorded by the Ukrainian Canadian band Cheremshina Ensemble, and was included in their album Cheremshina (volume 3).

2000s to the present 
In 2000, "A Duckling Swims in the Tisza" was included in the album Nashi partyzany (English: "our partisans") performed by Taras Chubay, Plach Yeremiyi, and Skryabin. The song enjoyed more commercial success in 2002 when it was included in a cappella group Pikkardiyska Tertsiya's album Eldorado. 

"A Duckling Swims in the Tisza" became a staple of Ukrainian choirs, including the Revutsky Academic Choir and the Kyiv Orthodox Theological Academy Choir. The song was performed at the Festival Internazionale Musica Sacra Virgo Lauretana in Italy.

In 2015, the Danish neofolk band Die Weisse Rose performed a cover of "A Duckling Swims in the Tisza" during a performance in Kyiv; a recording was subsequently included in their live album White Roses in Bloom in Kyiv.

Use during the Euromaidan and subsequent events 
In January 2014, a 2002 recording of "A Duckling Swims in the Tisza" recorded by Pikkardiyska Tertsiya was used during the funeral of Belarusian Euromaidan activist Mykhailo Zhyznevskyi, who had previously shared with friends that the song was his favourite. The song's lyrics and meaning have led to it being frequently used in memorials for killed protestors in the Euromaidan, the Revolution of Dignity, and the Russo-Ukrainian War, with it being called the "unofficial anthem" for fallen protestors and soldiers. The song was notably featured during the Armed Forces of Ukraine's Independence Day parade in August 2014, performed by the Revutsky Academic Choir.

Russian use during the siege of Mariupol 
In 2022, pro-Russian performers Akim Apachev and Daria Frey performed a cover of "A Duckling Swims in the Tisza", set to footage of the siege of Mariupol. That same year, Russian state-controlled television channel RT released a video for the song filmed in the ruins of the Azovstal Iron and Steel Works. YouTube subsequently removed the video due to it breaching its policy on hate speech.

References 

Ukrainian folk songs
Lemkos
Euromaidan
Revolution of Dignity